Strathearn or Strath Earn (from ) is the strath  of the River Earn, in Scotland, extending from Loch Earn in the West to the River Tay in the east. Strathearn was one of the original provinces of the Kingdom of Alba, and was led by a mormaer and then an Earl.  The province was bounded on the north by Atholl, north west by Breadalbane, south west by Menteith, south east by Fife, and on the east by Perthia.

History
The earliest attested mormaer of Strathearn is Mael Ísu I, who is recorded fighting alongside David I at the Battle of the Standard in 1138. Unlike some provinces where the holder of the office of mormaer rotated between kin-groups, the mormaership of Strathearn was dominated by a single family, with a Mael Ísu in every generation until the death of Mael Ísu V in the mid 14th century.

In medieval times, Strathearn was part of the region administered by the sheriff based at Perth.  When 19th century local government reforms replaced the ancient provinces by new Counties (shires), based on sheriffdom boundaries, Strathearn, therefore, became the south-central part of Perthshire. As a result of late 20th century reforms, it is now part of Perth and Kinross.

Royal dukedoms of Cumberland and Strathearn, of Kent and Strathearn and of Connaught and Strathearn have been awarded to members of the British Royal Family. Prince William was created Earl of Strathearn, as a subsidiary title to Duke of Cambridge, on 29 April 2011, the day of his wedding to Catherine Middleton.

Other uses

"Strathearn" / "Strathern" is also a surname in the United States and Northern Ireland, predominantly in the Bellaghy area of County Londonderry.

See also
List of places in Perth and Kinross
Medieval Diocese of Dunblane (or Strathearn)

References

Bibliography

External links
Historic map showing Strathearn in the Shire of Perth
Historic map showing Strathearn in Scotland
Historic map showing Strathearn in Scotland
Historic map showing Strathearn in Scotland

Valleys of Perth and Kinross
Provinces of Scotland